Mount Blue is a mountain in the White Mountains, located in Benton, New Hampshire.  In spite of its height over 4,000 feet, it is not usually considered one of the four-thousand footers of New Hampshire, because its prominence is less than 200 feet, making it a sub-peak of Mount Moosilauke.

References

Mountains of Grafton County, New Hampshire
Mountains of New Hampshire